Reid Anderson (born 15 October 1970) is a bassist and composer from Minnesota. He is a member of The Bad Plus with drummer Dave King, saxophonist Chris Speed, and guitarist Ben Monder. The original lineup of The Bad Plus first played together in 1989 and formally established the band in 2000. Anderson attended the University of Wisconsin-Eau Claire and graduated from the Curtis Institute of Music.

Discography

As leader
 Dirty Show Tunes (Fresh Sound, 1997)
 Abolish Bad Architecture (Fresh Sound, 1999)
 The Vastness of Space (Fresh Sound, 2000)

With The Bad Plus 
 The Bad Plus (Fresh Sound, 2001)
 These Are the Vistas (Columbia, 2003)
 Give (Columbia, 2004)
 Blunt Object: Live in Tokyo (Sony, 2005)
 Suspicious Activity? (Columbia, 2005)
 Prog (Heads Up, 2007)
 For All I Care (Heads Up, 2009)
 Never Stop (eOne/EmArcy, 2010)
 Made Possible (eOne, 2012)
 The Rite of Spring (Masterworks, 2014)
 Inevitable Western (Okeh, 2014)
 The Bad Plus Joshua Redman (Nonesuch, 2015)
 It's Hard (Okeh, 2016)
 Never Stop II (Legbreaker, 2018)
 Activate Infinity (Edition, 2019)
 The Bad Plus. (Edition, 2022)

With David King and Craig Taborn
 Golden Valley Is Now (Intakt, 2019)

As sideman
With Ethan Iverson
 Construction Zone (Originals) (Fresh Sound, 1998) 
 Deconstruction Zone (Standards) (Fresh Sound, 1998)  
 The Minor Passions (Fresh Sound, 1999)
 Live at Smalls (Fresh Sound, 2000)

With Bill McHenry
 Graphic (Fresh Sound, 1999)
 Bill McHenry Quartet featuring Paul Motian (Fresh Sound, 2003)
 Roses (Sunnyside, 2007)
 Ghosts of the Sun (Sunnyside, 2011)

With others
 Jeff Ballard, Fairgrounds (Edition, 2019)
 Till Bronner, German Songs (Minor Music, 1996)
 Uri Caine, The Goldberg Variations (Winter & Winter 2000)
 Bill Carrothers, The Electric Bill (Dreyfus, 2002)
 Gerald Cleaver, Adjust (Fresh Sound, 2001)
 Jamie Cullum, In the Mind of Jamie Cullum (District 6, 2007)
 Orrin Evans, Listen to the Band (Criss Cross, 1999)
 Fred Hersch, Songs Without Words (2001)
 Donna Lewis, Brand New Day (Palmetto, 2015)
 Orange Then Blue, Hold the Elevator (GM, 1999)
 Mark Turner, Dharma Days (Warner Bros., 2001)
 Patrick Zimmerli, Twelve Sacred Dances (Arabesque, 1998)

References

External links

 All About Jazz: Reid Anderson Live at the C Note
 An interview with Reid Anderson

American jazz double-bassists
Male double-bassists
Living people
University of Wisconsin–Eau Claire alumni
Curtis Institute of Music alumni
1970 births
Jazz musicians from Minnesota
21st-century double-bassists
21st-century American male musicians
American male jazz musicians
Orange Then Blue members
The Bad Plus members
Columbia Records artists
Fresh Sounds Records artists
Intakt Records artists